Sir William Carson (1770–1843) was a politician from Newfoundland

William Carson may also refer to:

William A. Carson (1863–?), New York State Senator
William J. Carson (Medal of Honor) (1840–1913), Union Army soldier
Bill Carson (ice hockey) (1900–1967), Canadian ice hockey forward
William James Carson (c. 1947–1979), alleged member of the Irish Republican Army
William Carson (cricketer) (1866–1955), New Zealand cricketer
William Carson Jr. (born 1950), American politician in the Delaware House of Representatives

See also
MV William Carson, a CN Marine passenger/vehicle icebreaker ferry
Carson Mansion, built for William Carson (1825–1912), the Northern California lumber baron
Bill Carson (disambiguation)
Willie Carson (disambiguation)
William Carlson (disambiguation)